Smoky Hill can refer to:
Smoky Hill City, Kansas
Smoky Hill River
Smoky Hill Township (disambiguation)
Smoky Hill High School Aurora, Colorado

See also
Smoky Hills, a region of hills, mostly in Kansas, through which the Smoky Hill River flows